Robert Peter Jensen (December 29, 1925 – October 8, 2015) was an American football end.

Jensen was born in 1925 in Chicago and attended high school at Lane Tech. He was captain of the Lane Tech football team and selected for all-Chicago honors in 1943. He served in the Navy after high school and then played college football for the Iowa State in 1946 and 1947. In 1947, he ranked fifth in the Big Six Conference with 11 receptions for 212 yards.

He was selected by the Boston Yanks with the 109th pick in the 1948 NFL Draft, but he instead took a job with the Carnegie Illinois Steel Company upon graduation.  He signed in July 1948 with the Chicago Rockets of the All-America Football Conference (AAFC). He played for the Rockets/Hornets in 1948 and 1949, and in the National Football League (NFL) for the Baltimore Colts during the 1950 season. He appeared in a total of 34 AAFC and NFL games and had 22 receptions for 290 yards and one touchdown.

He died in 2015 at age 89 in Rancho Mirage, California.

References

1925 births
2015 deaths
Chicago Rockets players
Chicago Hornets players
Baltimore Colts players
Iowa State Cyclones football players
Players of American football from Chicago